The 2014 Coupe de France Final decided the winner of the 2013–14 Coupe de France, the 97th season of France's premier football cup. It was played on 3 May at the Stade de France in Saint-Denis, Paris.

In the final, Guingamp beat Rennes 2–0 in a Derby Breton to win their second Coupe de France title. By winning, they  qualified for the Group Stage of the 2014–15 UEFA Europa League, and  the 2014 Trophée des Champions against the 2013–14 Ligue 1 champions Paris Saint-Germain.

Background
The match was Rennes' sixth final, of which they had won two (1965 and 1971). Their most recent final was in 2009, which they lost 2-1 to Guingamp. That was Guingamp's second appearance in the final after their unsuccessful attempt in 1997 when they lost on penalties to Nice.

Route to the final

Rennes
Rennes, of Ligue 1, began their campaign in the Round of 64 on 4 January at home to fellow top-flight team Valenciennes, winning 8-7 on penalties. In the next round, they won 2-0 at third-tier Boulogne, with goals from Anders Konradsen and Silvio Romero. In the Round of 16, away to Ligue 2 Auxerre, they won via a first-half Foued Kadir goal. Rennes then beat Lille 2-0 at home, with goals from Kamil Grosicki and Romain Alessandrini. In their semi-final on 15 April, Rennes beat second-tier Angers 3-2 at home, with Ola Toivonen, Grosicki and Jean Makoun scoring.

Guingamp
Guingamp, also of Ligue 1, entered into the Round of 64, where they played away to third-tier Bourg-Péronnas on 5 January and won via first-half goals from Claudio Beauvue and Mustapha Yatabaré. They went away again in the Round of 32, to fifth-tier Concarneau, and won 3-2 in extra-time after a 1-1 regulation-time draw, Yatabaré (2) and Beauvue again the scorers. In the Round of 16 Guingamp travelled to Corsica to play another fifth-tier club, Île-Rousse, who had reached that stage by defeating holders Bordeaux. Goals from Grégory Cerdan and Mustapha Diallo sent Guingamp into the quarter-finals, where they played AS Cannes and won 2-0 away again, through another Yatabaré brace. In the semi-final on 16 April 2014, Guingamp played at home against their first top-flight opponents, Monaco. Yatabaré scored early on, but Dimitar Berbatov equalised before half-time. The scores remained level into the second half of extra time, in which Guingamp scored twice, through Yatabaré and Fatih Atık.

Match

Summary 
Jonathan Martins Pereira scored the first goal for Guingamp with a  volley from the edge of the area in the 37th minute, and Mustapha Yatabaré got the second in the 46th minute with a powerful downward header from Steeven Langil's left-wing cross.

Details

References

Coupe De France Final 2014
Coupe de France Final 2014
Coupe De France Final 2014
2014
Coupe de France Final
Sport in Saint-Denis, Seine-Saint-Denis
Coupe de France Final